The 1989–90 Northern Iowa Panthers men's basketball team represented the University of Northern Iowa as a member of the Mid-Continent Conference during the 1989-90 NCAA Division I men's basketball season. The team was led by head coach Eldon Miller and played their home games at the UNI-Dome in Cedar Falls, Iowa. The Panthers won the Mid-Con tournament to earn an automatic bid to the NCAA tournament — the school’s first trip to the "Big Dance." In the first round, UNI upset No. 3 seed Missouri, 74–71. The Panthers fell to No. 6 seed Minnesota, 81–78, in the second round. The team finished with a record of 23–9 (6–6 in the Mid-Con).

The 1989–90 team was inducted into the UNI Athletics Hall of Fame in 2011.

Roster

Schedule and results

|-
!colspan=9 style=| Regular season

|-
!colspan=9 style=| Mid-Continent Conference tournament

|-
!colspan=9 style=| NCAA Tournament

References

External links
1990 NCAA Basketball First Round - University of Northern Iowa vs Missouri on YouTube

Northern Iowa
Northern Iowa Panthers men's basketball seasons
Northern Iowa
Panth
Panth